Nieszawa  is a village in the administrative district of Gmina Murowana Goślina, within Poznań County, Greater Poland Voivodeship, in west-central Poland. It is first mentioned in written records in 1388. There is a manor house in the village, dating from the first half of the 19th century and partially rebuilt in the later part of that century.

References

Nieszawa